Cape Hachiman may refer to:

 Cape Hachiman (Isumi, Chiba)
 Cape Hachiman (Katsuura, Chiba)